LPK-26 is a potent and selective κ-opioid agonist, and has analgesic effects.

References

Acetamides
Kappa-opioid receptor agonists
Chloroarenes
Pyrrolidines
Synthetic opioids